Elimia pybasi is a species of freshwater snail with an operculum, aquatic gastropod mollusks in the family Pleuroceridae. This species is endemic to the United States.

References 

Molluscs of the United States
pybasi
Gastropods described in 1862
Taxonomy articles created by Polbot